Ridgemont High School is a public high school in Mt. Victory, Ohio.  It is the only high school in the Ridgemont Local Schools district.  Their nickname is the Golden Gophers, a distinction they share with only two other high schools in The United States, Hueytown High School in Hueytown, Alabama and Pavilion High School in Pavilion, New York.

Notes and references

External links
 District Website

High schools in Hardin County, Ohio
Public high schools in Ohio
Public middle schools in Ohio